The 2012 Shamrock Shotgun was held from October 5 to 7 at the Shamrock Curling Club in Edmonton, Alberta as part of the 2012–13 World Curling Tour. The event was held in a round robin format. The purses for the men's and women's events are CAD$8,500 each, and the winners of each event, Danny Sherrard and Satsuki Fujisawa, received CAD$2,000. Sherrard defeated Thomas Scoffin in the final with a score of 8–4, while Fujisawa defeated Kim Eun-jung in the women's final with a score of 5–2.

Men

Teams
The teams are listed as follows:

Round-robin standings
Final round-robin standings

Playoffs

Women

Teams
The teams are listed as follows:

Round-robin standings
Final round-robin standings

Playoffs

References

External links

Shamrock Shotgun
Shamrock Shotgun
Sport in Edmonton
Curling in Alberta
Shamrock Shotgun